Blake Garden may refer to:

 Blake Garden, Hong Kong
 Blake Garden (Kensington, California), a public garden in the Berkeley Hills, overlooking the San Francisco Bay Area
 HK Blake Garden AA, a Hong Kong football club who competing in the Hong Kong Third A Division League